Poplar Springs is an unincorporated community in Stokes County, North Carolina, United States, approximately two miles east of King,  on North Carolina State Highway 66.

Unincorporated communities in Stokes County, North Carolina
Unincorporated communities in North Carolina